The Kerryonians were the second oldest  criminal street gang in New York City 
 but may have been the first gang in the city. The members were made up of recent Irish immigrants from County Kerry, Ireland. There was also a 19th-century Philadelphia gang of the same name. Beginning in the 1820s, the Kerryonians were part of the first wave of the early New York gangs, following behind the first and oldest gang in the city, the Forty Thieves, to occupy the Five Points area. The Kerryonians were particularly fond of targeting New Yorkers who were of British descent. The Kerryonians also fought a gang named the "Pelters". They are most known however for disrupting British actor William Charles Macready's performance at Astor Place around 1825. The Kerryonians were eventually absorbed into the growing street gangs of Five Points such as the Dead Rabbits, Roach Guards, and Chichesters.

References
Asbury, Herbert The Gangs of New York:  A History of the New York Underworld.  New York.  1928.  
Ellis, Edward Robb.  The Epic of New York City: A Narrative History.  New York:  Basic Books, 2011.

Specific

External links

Former gangs in New York City
Irish-American gangs
Irish-American culture in New York City